The Cathedral Church of Saint Mary the Virgin, commonly known as St Mary's Episcopal Cathedral, is a cathedral of the Anglican Scottish Episcopal Church in Edinburgh, Scotland. Its foundation stone was laid in Palmerston Place, in the city's West End, on 21 May 1874 by the Duke of Buccleuch and Queensberry, and the building was consecrated on 30 October 1879.

St Mary's Episcopal Cathedral is the see of the Bishop of Edinburgh, one of seven bishops within the Scottish Episcopal Church which is part of the worldwide Anglican Communion.

It was designed in a Victorian Gothic revival style by architect Sir George Gilbert Scott. It has attained Category A listed building status, and is part of the Old Town and New Town of Edinburgh World Heritage Site. The cathedral is one of only three in the United Kingdom that feature three spires, the other two being Lichfield and Truro cathedrals. The other two spires were completed in 1917. The Song School and the Chapter House were also added in later years.

History

In 1689, following the Glorious Revolution, Presbyterianism was restored in place of episcopacy in the national Church of Scotland. This led to the emergence of the Scottish Episcopal Church as a separate Christian denomination.

Edinburgh's historic St Giles' Cathedral was raised to cathedral status in 1633, the seat of the newly established Bishop of Edinburgh. However the rejection of episcopacy saw the cathedral converted to Presbyterian use. For a time the Episcopal residue of that congregation worshipped in an old woollen mill in Carrubber's Close, near the site of the present Old St Paul's Church.

A bequest by Barbara and Mary Walker left the cathedral's site in Edinburgh's West End to the Episcopal Church alongside an endowment allowing for the building of a cathedral dedicated to St Mary the Virgin. The sisters owned the surrounding Drumsheugh Estate and lived in Easter Coates House, which survives to the north of the cathedral. They were the granddaughters of the Rev. George Walker, the Episcopal minister of Oldmeldrum Church (1734–1781). Their father, William Walker, was Attorney in Exchequer, and Bearer of the White Rod of Scotland; their mother was Mary Drummond, daughter of George Drummond, six times Lord Provost of Edinburgh and initiator of the New Town. William Walker bought the Coates estate from the Byres family around 1800 and is remembered in the street names William Street and Walker Street round the corner from Manor Place.

Design and construction
The cathedral was designed by Sir George Gilbert Scott and the foundation stone was laid on 21 May 1874 by the Duke of Buccleuch and Queensberry, whose family had been supportive of Scottish episcopacy over the previous hundred years. Inside the stone was placed a bottle containing a copy of the trust deed, the Edinburgh Post Office Directory, Oliver and Boyd's Almanac, newspapers and coins. The cathedral's builder was G. W. Booth and the clerk of works was Edwin Morgan.

St Mary's Episcopal Cathedral has four main doors: the west, east, north and south doors. The cathedral's main entrance is the ornate west entrance, from Palmerston Place, which features Saint Peter and the key to the Kingdom of Heaven.

In preparation for the opening of the cathedral a congregation had been formed to worship in a temporary iron church erected on the site now occupied by the Song School. Beginning on 26 May 1876, it was ministered to by the dean, James Montgomery, and two chaplains, and grew rapidly. The nave of the cathedral was opened on 25 January 1879 and from that day, daily services have been held in the cathedral. The cathedral was consecrated on 30 October 1879 in the presence of about 200 clergy from around the country.

The twin spires at the west end, known as "Barbara" and "Mary" after the Walker sisters, were not begun until 1913 and completed in 1917. The architect for these was Charles Marriott Oldrid Scott, Sir George's grandson.

The reredos is designed by John Oldrid Scott and sculpted by Mary Grant. The critic Sacheverell Sitwell condemned the design as "peerless for ugliness, unless it be for its own sister, Scott's chapel of St John's, at Cambridge".

Music

Choral services

St Mary's Cathedral is the only cathedral in Scotland to maintain a tradition of daily choral services, for most of the year, with choristers drawn from its own choir school.

It was the first cathedral in Great Britain to employ girls in the treble line as well as boys, in 1978, when Dennis Townhill was organist and choir master. In 2005, St Mary's Cathedral became the first cathedral in the Anglican tradition to have a female alto singing in daily services.

Song School

The Song School was built in 1885. It was designed by John Oldrid Scott. It provided St Mary's choir with a rehearsal space which the choir use for their daily practice. It houses a second Father Willis organ (1829). The Song School walls are ornately decorated by the Irish-born artist Phoebe Anna Traquair. Guided tours of the Song School are available, at certain times during the year.

St Mary's Music School and choir

St Mary's Music School was founded to educate its choirboys. It continues to educate choristers of the cathedral and is now a separate specialist music school open to all pupils.

Bells

There are ten original bells in the central tower of the cathedral hung for change ringing, with two further bells which have been added more recently. They were the gift of the first dean of St Mary's, James F. Montgomery. The bells were all cast by John Taylor & Co. of Loughborough to weight ratios defined by Lord Grimthorpe who was a leading bell designer of his day. This is one of only a few complete Grimthorpe rings still in existence. The tenor bell weighs 41 cwt. The bells were dedicated on 29 October 1879.

“There is a tradition of the Bell Ringers’ prayer before they begin ringing the bells that sound out over the city of Edinburgh. The bells in our tower are individually named after virtues, and the prayer is that these virtues will ring out and flourish in the city's streets, including faith, humility, reverence, hope, peace, justice, love. We are called to care not just for our own families, and for our Cathedral community, but for the place in which we live.”

Revd Janet Spence ~ The Chaplain

Festival Fringe venue
St Mary's Episcopal Cathedral (Venue 91) hosts classical concerts, coffee concerts, lunchtime recitals, art events and exhibitions, during the annual Edinburgh Festival Fringe.

St Mary's also has an active calendar of concerts, charity concerts, events and exhibitions throughout the year.

Organists

1878 Thomas Henry Collinson
1929 Robert Head
1958 Eric Parsons
1961 Dennis Townhill
1991 Timothy Byram-Wigfield
1999 Matthew Owens
2005 Simon Nieminski
2007 (to current day) Duncan Ferguson (Master of Music & Organist)

Provosts of the cathedral
The provost in the Scottish Episcopalian church is the senior priest of the cathedral, with responsibility for the mother church of the diocese. When the bishop officiates, the provost is assistant priest. They are formally addressed as The Very Reverend and more informally as Provost <first name> or simply <first name>.

 1879–1897 James Montgomery
 1897–1919 John Wilson
 1920–1925 Edward Henderson
 1925–1938 William Margetson
 1938–1939 Logie Danson
 1940–1944 David Dunlop
 1944–1949 Ivor Ramsay
 1949–1956 Hector Gooderham
 1957–1967 Reginald Foskett
 1967–1970 Patrick Rodger
 1970–1990 Philip Crosfield
 1990–2017 Graham Forbes
 September 2017 (to current day) John Conway

Objects of interest

Memorials

 Captain James Dundas V.C. (1842–1879)
 General Sir Alexander Frank Philip Christison Bt. (1893–1993), erected by the Burma Star Association
 Soldiers of the Royal Scots killed overseas 1857–1870
 Reclining marble effigy of James Francis Montgomery (1902) by James Pittendrigh Macgillivray.
 Barbara and Mary Walker, the philanthropists who funded the church (see above)

The war memorial is by Pilkington Jackson (1920).

Rood cross
The Lorimer rood cross was designed as part of the National War Memorial, and completed by Sir Robert Lorimer in 1922. It is positioned high aloft the nave altar, unmissable as eyes lift to view the high altar, or the east lancet windows beyond. It is a striking figure of Christ crucified on a background of Flanders poppies and decorated with golden winged angels.

Walter Scott's pew

Sir Walter Scott’s pew moved to the cathedral in 2006. Its first location was in St George's Church on York Place and was then moved in 1932 to St Paul's Church across the road when the two congregations amalgamated, and the latter building became St Paul's and St George's.

Raised a Presbyterian in the Church of Scotland where he was ordained as an elder, in adult life he also adhered to the doctrine of the Scottish Episcopal Church.

Paolozzi’s ‘Millennium Window’

The cathedral is home to a stained-glass window reworked as an artwork in the Modern Art genre for year 2000 by Eduardo Paolozzi who was born in Leith. The glasswork consists of a large rose window with three lancet windows below, in vibrant colours of glass which are designed to project onto stonework inside the cathedral on bright days.

It is visible from the south side of St Mary's from Bishop's Walk but is best viewed from inside with the light behind, from either the Resurrection Chapel on the south side, or beside the ornate wooden casing and pipework of St Mary's ‘Father Willis’ organ on the north side.

Prayer labyrinth
The south grounds of the cathedral are accessed from Bishop's Walk or from the south doors in the Resurrection Chapel when these stand open.

A prayer labyrinth designed by artists connected with the cathedral has been carved and sown with wild flowers, with help from others in the congregation of St Mary's. Unlike a maze, a labyrinth is a single continuous route, from entry point to centre. The prayer labyrinth frees you to think your own thoughts or prayers for others, as you follow the path, edged by wild flowers; to attract insects.

Gallery

Links of further interest
 Primus of the Scottish Episcopal Church
 Bishop of Edinburgh Diocese
 Dean of Edinburgh Diocese, Frances Burberry
 Diocese of Edinburgh
 List of cathedrals in the United Kingdom
 St Mary's Cathedral, Edinburgh (Roman Catholic) is the Roman Catholic cathedral of similar name, but situated at the East End of Edinburgh.

References

Sources

Notes

External links 
 St Mary's Episcopal Cathedral website
 A history of the choristers of St Mary's Cathedral

 
Christianity in Edinburgh
Edinburgh
Mary's Cathedral (Episcopal)
Gothic Revival church buildings in Scotland
Category A listed buildings in Edinburgh
Listed cathedrals in Scotland
George Gilbert Scott buildings